20 of the Best was a 1980s series of compilation albums by RCA Records and may refer to:

20 of the Best (Gary Stewart album), 1984
20 of the Best (Willie Nelson album), 1982
20 of the Best, by Chet Atkins, 1986
20 of the Best, by The Browns, 1985
20 of the Best, by Floyd Cramer, 1982